The 1925 Brown Bears football team was an American football team that represented Brown University as an independent during the 1925 college football season. In its 24th and final season under head coach Edward N. Robinson, the team compiled a 5–4–1 record and outscored opponents by a total of 215 to 80.

Brown played its home games in the newly-constructed Brown Stadium in Providence, Rhode Island. The stadium was built at a cost of $500,000.

Schedule

References

Brown
Brown Bears football seasons
Brown Bears football